Ross Moriarty (born 18 April 1994) is an international rugby union player, who currently plays for Dragons RFC and Wales as a flanker.

Personal life
Moriarty was born in St Helens, Merseyside while his father, former Wales international Paul Moriarty, was in the north of England playing rugby league. Moriarty is also the nephew of former Wales international captain Richard Moriarty.

He was educated at Glyncollen Primary School and Morriston Comprehensive School in Swansea, Wales. He took up rugby union at the age of ten playing for Swansea Schools and West Wales Schools. He also played his junior rugby at Gorseinon RFC

Club career
Moriarty made his debut for Gloucester on 10 November 2012 against the Ospreys, his age-grade team in the LV= Cup. He did not play for Gloucester regularly in his first season however, but was a regular with Hartpury RFC, where he was a student.

On 27 November 2017, Moriarty decided to leave Gloucester to join Welsh region Dragons in the Pro14 on a two-year WRU central contract from the 2018-19 season.

International career

England
Moriarty made his international debut with England Under-18 against France at Fylde in February 2012. He went on to score tries against Scotland and Wales in his first four appearances, and helped England to become European champions in Spain.

He started the first two games for England in the 2013 under-20 Six Nations but was unavailable for the final three matches after being red carded in the match against Ireland in Athlone. He played in every match of the 2013 IRB Junior World Championship and scored three tries against the US in a pool game.

In the 2014 IRB Junior World Championship Moriarty won the tournament with England with impressive performances throughout the whole tournament.

Wales
Moriarty made his full international debut in the starting line up for Wales versus Ireland on 8 August 2015. On 15 September 2015, Moriarty was chosen as a replacement for Eli Walker in the 2015 Rugby World Cup squad after Walker suffered an injury.

Moriarty came off the bench against Ireland in the opening match of the 2022 Six Nations Championship to earn his 50th cap in the 29-7 loss.

International tries

References

External links
Gloucester Rugby profile
 Dragons profile

1994 births
Living people
British & Irish Lions rugby union players from Wales
Dragons RFC players
English people of Welsh descent
English rugby union players
Gloucester Rugby players
Rugby union players from Morriston
Rugby union flankers
Rugby union number eights
Rugby union players from St Helens, Merseyside
Wales international rugby union players
Welsh rugby union players
Hartpury University R.F.C. players